Lemuria is a hypothetical land mass in the Indian Ocean.

Lemuria may also refer to:

 Lemuria (festival), in Roman religion, a domestic ritual to appease the unwholesome and malevolent spectres of the restless dead (lemures)

Fiction 
 Lemuria (comics), two fictional locations in comic books published by Marvel Comics
 Lemuria, a mysterious hidden island in the video game series Golden Sun
 Lemuria, a 2004 RPG world designed for the d20 Modern game by Swedes Anders Blixt and Krister Sundelin
 Lemuria (Transformers), one of four missing spaceships in the animated television series Transformers: Cybertron
 Lemuria, a character in the reality TV series Who Wants to Be a Superhero?

Music 
 Lemuria (American band), an indie/punk band from Buffalo, New York, USA
 Lemuria (Belgian band), a Belgian black folk metal band
 Lemurian (album), a 2008 album by Lone
 Lemuria (album), a 2004 album by Therion, or the title song

See also

 Lemurians (disambiguation)
 Lemur (disambiguation)